Chalong Pakdeevijit (born Boonchalong Pakdeevijit on March 18, 1931 in Bangkok) is a Thai film & TV director, producer, cinematographer and voice actor. In February of 2023, he was certified by the Guinness Book of World Records as the Oldest TV Director for his work on the mini-series 'The Maekhong Connection' for Thailand most watched TV network Ch.7HD.  Dubbed as 'King of Action,' Chalong is best known for creating, directing and producing action films and TV shows. He is the first Thai director to break into the international market and achieved great success both financially and critically with his action-packed film 'S.T.A.B.'('Gold'). He's known to his adoring Thai fans of all ages as 'Ar Long', and internationally as Philip Chalong or P. Chalong.

For more than 70 years, Chalong has created, produced and directed more than 60 movies and TV shows.  His films include Fhon Tai (1970), Fhon Nuea (1970), Thong (S.T.A.B.; 1973), Thong 2 (Gold Raiders; 1982), Thong 3 (The Lost Idol; 1988) and Thong 4 (In Gold We Trust; 1990). When Thai films ticket sales started to decline, Chalong made an iconic transition over to television and started to produce action miniseries exclusively for Thailand's most watched TV network, ch. 7. With the highly successful and top-rated television debut 'Raya(' (1998)), Chalong has begun a string of many successful top-rated action-packed miniseries for CH. 7 until today. According to ACNeilsen (Thailand) published on WTFintheworld.com, he is the only director in Thailand with 2 entries in the top 10 of Thailand Highest Rating Television Miniseries of All Time.  These 2 ch. 7 miniseries includes 'Chumphae()' (2007) and 'Sao Har' (2011). Today, at the age of 87, Chalong shows no sign of stopping and continues to direct and produce top-rated miniseries. He earned the nickname "Action Film Tycoon", by his style of films, called in Thailand Raboet Phukhao Phao Krathom (ระเบิดภูเขา เผากระท่อม; lit: "Bombing Mountain, Burning Cabin").

Early life 
He was born into a filmmaker family. His father was a director and producer, and his brothers are all in the movie industry. He started as a cinematographer in 1950, and directed the first film in 1968.

Career 
In the 70's he was very successful in Thong(), it can be make a money and release to foreign countries. The highlight of this film is the introduction of foreign actors to lead in Thai films such as Greg Morris, Thẩm Thúy Hằng. It became his style in the ensuing films, it often takes foreign actors to take the lead role, such as Jan-Michael Vincent, Christopher Mitchum, and Olivia Hussey.

His last film was Sud Keed : Mungkorn Chao Phraya 2 (Chaophya Dragon 2) in 1996, before turning to produced and directed TV series for Channel 7 in 1998, starting Raya lead role by Pete Thongchua and Chatmongkol Bumpen. He is the pioneer of the action series on Channel 7.

In 2013, he was appointed National Artist of Performing arts (film & television - director & executive producer) from Ministry of Culture.

Personal life 
On December 28, 2014, he was married for the second time to a 38-year-old bride after his former wife died from cancer earlier.

References

External links

1931 births
Living people
Chalong Pakdeevijit
Chalong Pakdeevijit
Chalong Pakdeevijit
Chalong Pakdeevijit
Chalong Pakdeevijit
Chalong Pakdeevijit